Live In Barcelona is a full concert video DVD of a performance by Bruce Springsteen & the E Street Band of their Rising Tour performance of October 16, 2002 at Palau Sant Jordi in Barcelona, Catalonia, Spain.

The first half of the show was broadcast live at the time across Europe on MTV Europe and VH1 UK; the broadcast concluded with Springsteen's biggest hit, "Dancing in the Dark", unusually placed in the middle of the regular set for that reason.  A tape of the broadcast was later aired by CBS in the United States on February 28, 2003 as well. The performance of "Waitin' on a Sunny Day" was released as a music video to promote the single.

Released on November 18, 2003 after the tour's conclusion and now incorporating the complete Barcelona performance, this DVD was the first time that an entire Springsteen concert was documented with an official release in either audio or video. Unlike the prior tour's concert video Bruce Springsteen & The E Street Band: Live in New York City, no equivalent audio-only album release was made.

Contents

Disc one
"The Rising"
"Lonesome Day"
"Prove It All Night"
"Darkness on the Edge of Town"
"Empty Sky"
"You're Missing"
"Waitin' on a Sunny Day"
"The Promised Land"
"Worlds Apart"
"Badlands"
"She's the One"
"Mary's Place"
"Dancing in the Dark"
"Countin' on a Miracle"
"Spirit in the Night"
"Incident on 57th Street"
"Into the Fire"

Disc two
"Night"
"Ramrod"
"Born to Run"
"My City of Ruins"
"Born in the U.S.A."
"Land of Hope and Dreams"
"Thunder Road"
Drop the Needle and Pray: The Rising on Tour, a documentary featuring footage from shows on the Summer 2003 leg of the tour at Fenway Park and Giants Stadium, interviews with Springsteen and band members, and unpublished photographs.

Personnel
As listed on the DVD cover:
The E Street Band
Roy Bittan – keyboards
Clarence Clemons – saxophone, percussion
Danny Federici – keyboards, accordeon 
Nils Lofgren – guitar, vocals
Patti Scialfa – guitar, vocals
Bruce Springsteen – guitar, vocals
Garry Tallent – bass guitar
Stevie Van Zandt – guitar, vocals
Max Weinberg – drums
with Soozie Tyrell – vocals, violin

Charts

Certifications

References

 DVD cover notes at official Springsteen website

External links 
 

Bruce Springsteen video albums
2003 live albums
2003 video albums
Live video albums
Bruce Springsteen live albums
2000s English-language films